Closs is a surname. Notable people with the surname include:

 Jayme Closs, (born 2005), American kidnapping victim
 Keith Closs, (born 1976), American basketball center
 Kevin Closs, (born 1963), Canadian singer-songwriter
 Maurice Closs, (born 1971), Argentine politician
 William Closs, (1922–2011), American basketball forward-center